Melittia chalybescens is a moth of the family Sesiidae. It is known only from  Queensland, where it was collected near Kuranda and Mackay.

The length of the forewings is 14–15 mm for males and about 16 mm for females.

External links
Australian Faunal Directory
Classification of the Superfamily Sesioidea (Lepidoptera: Ditrysia)
New records and a revised checklist of the Australian clearwing moths (Lepidoptera: Sesiidae)

Moths of Australia
Sesiidae
Moths described in 1892